Larry Gottfried (born December 8, 1959, in Miami) is a former American male professional tour tennis player.
He is the brother of former tennis-star Brian Gottfried.

References

External links 
 
 

1959 births
Living people
American male tennis players
Jewish American sportspeople
Jewish tennis players
Tennis players from Miami
21st-century American Jews